The Yang's Saga is a 1985 Hong Kong historical fantasy action miniseries based on a series of novels and plays titled The Generals of the Yang Family produced by TVB. It aired from 23 to 28 September 1985 on TVB Jade, during the station's anniversary season and temporarily replacing the time slot of Enjoy Yourself Tonight.

Starring the Five Tiger Generals of TVB, the drama also featured the largest star-studded cast at the time in all of Hong Kong television history, including many of the industry's current top award-winning global television and cinematic stars.

Cast
 Note: Some of the characters' names are in Cantonese romanisation.

Yeung clan

Poon family

Sung royal family

Sung court officials

Liao Dynasty

Deities

External links
 The Yang's Saga on Hong Kong Cinemagic
  The Yang's Saga page on TVB website

TVB dramas
1985 Hong Kong television series debuts
1985 Hong Kong television series endings
Hong Kong action television series
Television series set in the Northern Song
Television series set in the Liao dynasty
Martial arts television series
Fantasy television series
Works based on The Generals of the Yang Family
Asian wars in television
1980s Hong Kong television series
Fictional depictions of Bao Zheng in television
Television shows set in Kaifeng
Cantonese-language television shows